Nogometno društvo Beltinci is a Slovenian football club from the town of Beltinci. The club was established in 2006 after the dissolution of NK Beltinci in the early 2000s. As of the 2022–23 season, the club competes in the Slovenian Second League.

Honours
League
 Slovenian Third League
 Winners: 2015–16, 2017–18

Pomurska League (fourth tier)
 Winners: 2011–12

Slovenian Sixth Division
 Winners: 2007–08

Cup
MNZ Murska Sobota Cup
 Winners: 2015–16, 2018–19

League history

References

External links
Official website 

Association football clubs established in 2006
Football clubs in Slovenia
2006 establishments in Slovenia